Nopalitos is a dish made with diced nopales, the naturally flat stems, called pads, of prickly pear cactus (Opuntia). They are sold fresh, bottled, or canned and less often dried. They have a light, slightly tart flavor, and a crisp, mucilaginous texture. Nopalitos are often eaten with eggs as a breakfast and in salads and soups as lunch and dinner meals.

See also
 List of Mexican dishes

References 

Salads
Mexican soups

es:Nopal#Gastronomia